Philippe Bühler (born 29 November 1981) a.k.a. Philippe Heithier (named after his mother's birth name) is a German singer, songwriter, dancer, record producer and manager. He came to fame as a contestant on the second season of Deutschland sucht den Superstar, the German version of Pop Idol. Bühler was eliminated in the top 3 after receiving 29.12 percent of the vote.

Discography

Albums 
2008: TBA

Singles 
"Warum"  (Why) (2005)
"Ich kann Dich lieben" (I can love you) (2006)

Performances
 Top 50: "I'll Be There" (Jackson 5)
 Wildcards: "Senorita" (Justin Timberlake)
 Top 13: "Cosmic Girl" (Jamiroquai)
 Top 11: "You Are Not Alone" (Michael Jackson)
 Top 10: "Tainted Love" (Soft Cell)
 Top 9:  "Winter Wonderland"
 Top 8:  "I'm Still Standing" (Elton John)
 Top 7:  "For Once in My Life" (Stevie Wonder)
 Top 6:  "September" (Earth,Wind, and Fire)
 Top 5:  "Sie sieht mich nicht (She does not see me)" (Xavier Naidoo)
 Top 4:  "Walking Away" (Craig David)
 Top 4:  "Maria Maria" (Santana)
 Top 3:  "A Whiter Shade of Pale" (Procol Harum)
 Top 3:  "Respect" (Aretha Franklin) – Eliminado

References

1981 births
Living people
People from Friedrichshafen
21st-century German male singers
Deutschland sucht den Superstar participants